Maharana Pratap Sports College is a sports academy and a college in Raipur, Dehradun, Uttarakhand. It offers sports training in six sports, Athletics, Football, Volleyball, Boxing, Cricket and Field hockey in sixth to twelfth standard and with the curriculum of Uttarakhand Board. It was only sports college in the state until the establishment of Hari Singh Thapa Sports College at Pithoragarh.

Sports facilities
 Multipurpose Indoor Stadium
Rajiv Gandhi International Cricket Stadium, Dehradun
Astroturf Hockey Ground
 Athletic field
 Cricket Ground
 Football Ground

References

External links

Sport schools in India
High schools and secondary schools in Uttarakhand
Education in Dehradun district
Sport in Dehradun
Sports venues in Uttarakhand
Educational institutions established in 1993
1993 establishments in Uttar Pradesh